Marcia Carol Martin Anderson ( Mahan; born 1957) is a retired senior officer of the United States Army Reserve. She was the first African-American woman to become a major general in the United States Army Reserve.

Early life
Anderson was born in Beloit, Wisconsin, and finished school in St. Louis, Missouri.

Career
As a civilian, Anderson serves as Clerk of Court for the United States Bankruptcy Court for the Western District of Wisconsin.

Anderson is a 1979 graduate of Creighton University in Omaha, Nebraska, a 1986 graduate of Rutgers School of Law–Newark in New Jersey, and a 2003 graduate of the United States Army War College. She is married to Amos Charles Anderson. She originally signed up for the Reserve Officers' Training Corps at Creighton University because she needed a science credit.

In 2011, Anderson became the first African-American woman to achieve the federally recognized rank of major general in the US Army, US Army Reserve and the US Army National Guard.

Anderson retired from the reserve army in 2016 and from her civilian job in 2019. Since 2021, she has served as a member of the Green Bay Packers Executive Committee.

Personal life 
Anderson lives in Wisconsin with her husband Amos Charles Anderson,the couple have no childen of their own.

Awards 
Anderson's military awards and decorations include the Army Distinguished Service Medal, Legion of Merit with two oak leaf clusters, the Meritorious Service Medal with three oak leaf clusters, the Army Commendation Medal, the Army Achievement Medal, the Parachutist Badge, and the Physical Fitness Badge.

Notes

External links

 
 C-SPAN Q&A interview with Anderson, December 11, 2011
  Paving the way for women’s success in army interview with Melissa Harris-Perry, February 15, 2014

1957 births
Living people
African-American female military personnel
Female generals of the United States Army
African-American women lawyers
American women lawyers
American lawyers
African-American lawyers
Creighton University alumni
People from Beloit, Wisconsin
Military personnel from Wisconsin
People from East St. Louis, Illinois
Recipients of the Legion of Merit
Rutgers School of Law–Newark alumni
21st-century African-American people
21st-century African-American women
20th-century African-American people
20th-century African-American women
Military personnel from Illinois
African-American United States Army personnel